Thomas Gould (born July 1968) is an Irish Sinn Féin politician who has been a Teachta Dála (TD) for the Cork North-Central constituency since the 2020 general election.

Political career 
He was a member of Cork City Council, originally for the Cork City North Central Ward in 2009 and for the Cork City North West local electoral area from 2019. Gould was a candidate in the 2016 General Election in Cork North-Central, but was not elected. He was a candidate in the 2019 Cork North-Central by-election, but was not elected. Gould was elected at the 2020 general election in Cork North Central. He received almost 27% of the first preference votes cast in the constituency. He was selected after Jonathan O'Brien had announced that he would not seek re-election. Mick Nugent was co-opted to Gould's seat on Cork City Council following his election to Dáil Eireann.

In 2018, Gould claimed that the spending by Cork City Council for Prince Charles and Camilla was "overkill". In 2021, he defended former Sinn Féin politician Martin Ferris in saying that members of the Provisional IRA “were not criminals.” Gould stated that the Provisional IRA  was made up of volunteers “who stepped up in their community” at a time when they were “under attack”.

Early and personal life
Gould is from the Cork suburb of Knocknaheeny, and lives in Gurranabraher with his wife and two daughters. He was a logistics manager. He is involved with St. Vincent's GAA. In addition to this, he was serving on the board of directors of the Firkin Crane as of 2020.

References

External links
Thomas Gould's page on the Sinn Féin website

Living people
1968 births
Local councillors in Cork (city)
Members of the 33rd Dáil
Politicians from County Cork
Sinn Féin TDs (post-1923)
Alumni of Cork Institute of Technology